Jeanne Grendel (23 March 1913 – 18 June 1987) was a Dutch swimmer. She competed in the women's 100 metre backstroke event at the 1928 Summer Olympics.

References

External links
 

1913 births
1987 deaths
Olympic swimmers of the Netherlands
Swimmers at the 1928 Summer Olympics
Swimmers from Rotterdam
Dutch female backstroke swimmers
20th-century Dutch women